Cuddles may refer to:

As a nickname:
Jamie Cudmore (born 1978), Canadian rugby union player
Cadel Evans (born 1977), Australian cyclist
Cuddles Marshall (1925-2007), American Major League Baseball relief pitcher
S. Z. Sakall (1883-1955), Hungarian-born Hollywood character actor
Greg Welts, former member of the American heavy metal band Slipknot (1997-1998)

Fictional characters:
Cuddles, in the UK comic The Dandy - see Cuddles and Dimples
Cuddles (Happy Tree Friends), a rabbit in the American flash cartoon Happy Tree Friends
Cuddles the comfort doll, in the Canadian television series Puppets Who Kill
Cuddles the Monkey, a puppet operated and voiced by ventriloquist Keith Harris

Lists of people by nickname